IDIRIYA, is a not-for-profit humanitarian organisation focusing on disability rights based in Sri Lanka.

History 

IDIRIYA was founded in 2005 by disability activist Ajith C. S. Perera.

Significant contributions

IDIRIYA in 2007 helped formulate the first Sri Lanka building design standard—SLS ISO TR 9527:2006.

A fundamental rights application was filed by IDIRIYA at the Supreme Court of Sri Lanka in March 2009.

References

Further reading
Don’t ‘dis’ the Ability of the Largest Minority
Accessibility for Humanity - The Way Forward
Accessibility to Public Buildings
To Empower the dis-Abled
 Let us Design to 'Include Everyone'

External links

 PRESIDENTIAL CANDIDATES OVERLOOK OUR BIGGEST MINORITY GROUP
 Imperative national need - Implementing the Supreme Court Order on Accessibility

2005 establishments in Sri Lanka
Non-profit organisations based in Sri Lanka
Disability organisations based in Sri Lanka
Accessible building
Accessibility
Organizations established in 2005